George Agbazika Innih (25 September 1938 – 15 August 2002) was a Nigerian Army general and statesman. He was the military governor of Bendel and Kwara States.

Early years

George Agbazika Innih was born on September 25, 1938, at Agenebode, Etsako East Local Government Area (LGA) of Edo State. He was educated at Catholic school, Akure, the Government school in Warri, the  Holy Cross Catholic school in Benin City and Edo College, Benin City.

Military career

He joined the army, and was trained at Mons Officer Cadet School in Aldershot, England (1962), then at the Royal Military Academy Sandhurst, England (1962–1964) and 1972.
He was appointed platoon commander, 4th Infantry Battalion, Ibadan (1964–65), deputy military secretary, Supreme Headquarters, Lagos, Colonel General Staff 3rd Marine Commando (1968–69) and brigade commander, 5 Infantry Brigade, Onitsha 1974–74.

After the coup of 29 July 1975, by Brigadier Murtala Mohammed, he was made military governor of Bendel State, since split into Edo State and Delta State.
Soon after taking control, he dissolved the executive council and the boards of statutory corporations, suspended all contract awards, and set up committees to review finances and projects undertaken by his predecessor Samuel Ogbemudia. Several serving officers were retired from service.

On 13 February 1976, General Murtala Mohammed was killed in a failed coup and his second-in-command, his chief of staff Lt-Gen. Olusegun Obasanjo, was appointed as head of state.  In March, Obasanjo redeployed Colonel Innih to Kwara state, replacing him with Navy captain Hussaini Abdullahi. Innih served in Kwara State as military governor until 1978.

He was Quarter Master General of the Nigerian Army (1978–79) and general officer commanding, I Infantry Division, Nigerian Army (1979–80), when he retired.

Subsequent career

Innih became the president of Retired Officers of Nigerian Armed Forces Organization (RANAO). He was chairman/managing director of Niger Valley Agro Industries Limited, chairman / managing director of Tamsaks Nigeria Limited and chairman of Bridgestone Finance Limited. He was honored with the Order of the Federal Republic (OFR).
The University of Ilorin awarded him an Honorary Doctor of Law in 1998. He died in 2002.

References

Nigerian generals
1938 births
2002 deaths
Governors of Kwara State
Graduates of the Mons Officer Cadet School
Graduates of the Royal Military Academy Sandhurst
Officers of the Order of the Federal Republic